The Penny Plunderer (Joe Coyne) is a fictional criminal in the DC Universe, and an adversary of Batman.  He first appeared in World's Finest Comics #30 (September–October 1947).  The story was written by uncredited Bill Finger; the art was credited to Bob Kane.

Fictional character history

Joe Coyne began his career selling newspapers, but he was soon caught stealing pennies. He now commits crimes which center around pennies. In "The Penny Plunderers", he leaves Batman and Robin in a deathtrap shaped like a giant penny, with a penny each as a token of their worth - just two cents.  Batman turns the tables by using the coins to make a battery and signal for help.  The giant penny often shown in the Batcave is a trophy of Batman's defeat of the Penny Plunderer.

Though he is a classic adversary of Batman, he has recently been ret-conned out of Batman's rogue gallery. The giant penny has also been the focus of a ret-con and is now canonically known as an item that Two-Face attempted to use to crush Batman.  The Penny Plunderer's last known whereabouts were at death row in Arkham Asylum. He wore a green suit and had black hair. He made only one appearance.

In Scarecrow/Two Face: Year One, Penny Plunderer makes a cameo appearance. He is robbing a bank with the underground approval of the Penguin. Again he has a green pin-striped suit. He is attacked by Two-Face, who is waging his own vigilante war. The Batman confronts them both. Two-Face destroys the supports on the classic giant penny, which is inside the bank being robbed. It crushes Penny Plunderer, killing him and almost killing Jim Gordon. Batman stops the coin.

In other media
The Penny Plunderer appeared on promotional artwork released for Harley Quinn.
The giant penny makes an appearance in the Titans episode "Barbara Gordon" in the Batcave.

References

Comics characters introduced in 1947
Golden Age supervillains
DC Comics supervillains
Characters created by Bob Kane
Characters created by Bill Finger